Coonskin may refer to:

 The skin of a raccoon
 Coonskin cap, a type of hat
 Coonskin (film), a 1975 animated film by Ralph Bakshi